The Okhamandal State Railway was a  metre gauge railway financed by the Okhamandal State.

History
The line between Kuranga and Arthara was sanctioned in 1913. In 1918, work on this line was stopped due to the war. In 1921, the Gaekwar's Baroda State Railway (GBSR) took over the management and operation of the Okhamandal State Railway. In 1922 the Kuranga–Okha Railway branch was opened which linked to the Okha Port Trust Railway. In 1923 the operation and maintenance of the Okhamandal State Railway was passed to the Jamnagar & Dwarka Railway. Saurashtra Railway came into being in April, 1948 with the amalgamation of a number of state railways which included Okhamandal State Railway.

Conversion to broad gauge
The railway was converted to  broad gauge in 1984.

References 

Saurashtra (region)
Defunct railway companies of India
Metre gauge railways in India
History of rail transport in Gujarat
1918 establishments in India
1948 disestablishments in India